Maaungoodhoo (Dhivehi: މާއުނގޫދޫ) is one of the inhabited islands of the Shaviyani Atoll administrative division and geographically part of the Miladhummadulhu Atoll in the Maldives.

Geography

Demography

References

External links 
  

Islands of the Maldives